Mauro Giallombardo (born December 29, 1989) is an Argentine racing driver. He has run in different series, with major success in Turismo Carretera.

Mauro was champion in two lower championships to Turismo Carretera: TC Mouras and TC Pista in 2008 and 2010, respectively. In 2011 he made his TC debut and won the championship the following year.

Later he debuted in Turismo Nacional, Súper TC 2000, Stock Car Brasil and Top Race V6. He won the 200 km de Buenos Aires in 2010 (with Bernardo Llaver) and 2014 (with Néstor Girolami).

In August 2017 he had an road accident. Giallombardo suffered a head injury and was in an induced coma for almost a month. After this, he focused on recovering his motor skills affected by the accident. He has not race since.

External links
 Official website

Argentine racing drivers
TC 2000 Championship drivers
Turismo Carretera drivers
Top Race V6 drivers
Stock Car Brasil drivers
1989 births
Living people
Blancpain Endurance Series drivers
Formula Renault Argentina drivers
Súper TC 2000 drivers
Motorsport team owners